Bae Sung-duk (born April 19, 1970) is a South Korean sport shooter. He competed at the 2000 Summer Olympics in the men's 50 metre rifle three positions event, in which he tied for 25th place, and the men's 50 metre rifle prone event, in which he tied for 38th place.

References

1970 births
Living people
ISSF rifle shooters
South Korean male sport shooters
Olympic shooters of South Korea
Shooters at the 2000 Summer Olympics
Asian Games medalists in shooting
Asian Games silver medalists for South Korea
Shooters at the 1990 Asian Games
Medalists at the 1990 Asian Games
20th-century South Korean people
21st-century South Korean people